Petrovo-Fedorovka is a rural locality (a village) in Iglinsky Selsoviet, Iglinsky District, Bashkortostan, Russia. The population was 17 as of 2010. There is 1 street.

Geography 
Petrovo-Fedorovka is located 7 km south of Iglino (the district's administrative centre) by road. Iglino is the nearest rural locality.

References 

Rural localities in Iglinsky District